Frederico Gil and Filip Prpic were the defending champions. They chose not to compete this year.
Leoš Friedl and Dušan Vemić won the title, defeating Brian Battistone and Andreas Siljeström 7–6(6), 7–6(3) in the finals.

Seeds

Draw

Draw

References
 Doubles Draw

American Express - TED Open - Doubles
PTT İstanbul Cup